The Reformed Church of Saint-Étienne, also known as the Temple of Saint-Étienne, is a Protestant church located in the municipality of Moudon, canton of Vaud, Switzerland. It is a parish church of the Evangelical Reformed Church of the Canton of Vaud. It is listed as a heritage site of national significance.

History
The church of Saint-Étienne was first mentioned in 1134–1143, even though it may have been built earlier. It was situated outside the Medieval village and was the counterpart of the Chapelle Notre-Dame located on the hill. The church was nicknamed "the cathedral of Broye", a region around the Broye river, by the residents of Moudon. It was modelled after the Gothic style. After a bell tower was added in 1420, the church was enlarged and renovated between 1495 and 1499, then again between 1499 and 1502. Paintings were added to the vaults between 1506 and 1511.

After the conquest by the canton of Bern in 1536, the side altars and the statues of the church were destroyed and the building became a Reformed temple. The building was restored several times (mainly the interior) around 1563 (when a new stone communion table was added) and 1695 (new pulpit made of molasse). The organ and the current rostrums were installed in 1764.

The church was listed among the Cultural Property of National Significance.

See also
List of cultural property of national significance in Switzerland: Vaud

References

Further reading
 

Reformed church buildings in Switzerland
Churches in Vaud
Churches completed in 1502
Cultural property of national significance in the canton of Vaud